Khwichang Baptist Church is a Baptist church located in Kutna Kami village area of Tripura. It has a strength of about 300 baptized communicant members. Pastor Biswa Kumar Debbarma is the local pastor. It is located just beside the road near the Kutna Bari Junior Basic School.

History 
Khwichang Baptist Church was established on 3 April 1988 on an Easter Sunday. It was inaugurated by Rev. Hnehliana, who was the then General Secretary of TBCU.

References

Churches in Tripura
Baptist Christianity in Tripura
West Tripura district
Baptist churches in India